High Pines is an area in El Paso County, Colorado, United States near the statutory town of Monument.

Geography
The approximate center of High Pines is 2 miles due north east of the center of Monument, Colorado.

Demographics
In the community the population was spread out, with 31.0% under the age of 18, 4.4% from 18 to 24, 25.1% from 25 to 44, 31.8% from 45 to 64, and 7.7% who were 65 years of age or older.  The median age was 40 years. For every 100 females, there were 103.1 males.  For every 100 females age 18 and over, there were 100.6 males.

The median income for a household in the community was $97,359, and the median income for a family was $99,924. Males had a median income of $76,333 versus $38,301 for females. The per capita income for the community was $38,758.  About 1.3% of families and 2.5% of the population were below the poverty line, including 4.3% of those under age 18 and 2.8% of those age 65 or over.

See also

Outline of Colorado
Index of Colorado-related articles
State of Colorado
Colorado cities and towns
Colorado census designated places
Colorado counties
El Paso County, Colorado
Colorado metropolitan areas
Front Range Urban Corridor
Colorado Springs, CO Metropolitan Statistical Area

References 

Unincorporated communities in El Paso County, Colorado